Erich Hof (3 August 1936 – 25 January 1995) was an Austrian footballer and coach who played as a forward.

Career
Born in the Brigittenau district of Vienna, Hof began playing football as a striker with FC Hochstädt. In 1952, he joined Wiener Sport-Club, where he would play until 1969, with the exception of a brief stint with FK Austria Wien in 1964. He led the Austrian league in goal-scoring in 1959 and 1961 with 32 and 21 goals respectively. Hof was a leading Austrian footballer in the 1960s and was known as "The Professor of Football" (Der Professor des Fußballs).

Hof made 37 appearances and scored 28 goals for the Austria national football team from 1957 to 1968. He made his debut in a friendly match against West Germany on 10 March 1957.

Personal life
Hof died from lung cancer in a Vienna hospital on 25 January 1995.

He was the brother of retired footballer Norbert Hof.

References

External links
Austria Archiv as player 
Austria Archiv as coach 
National Team stats as player 
National Team stats as coach 

1936 births
1995 deaths
Austrian footballers
Association football forwards
Austria international footballers
Austrian football managers
Austria national football team managers
Wiener Sport-Club players
FK Austria Wien players
FK Austria Wien managers
Wiener Sport-Club managers
Footballers from Vienna
Deaths from cancer in Austria
Deaths from lung cancer
People from Brigittenau